"Jasmine" (sometimes styled "jasmine (demo)") is a song by Jai Paul, first released in 2012 as a digital download.

Release 
"Jasmine" was first released on SoundCloud on 30 March 2012. It was later re-released on Paul's debut album Leak 04-13 (Bait Ones) (2019), an unofficial version of which was leaked in 2013. Paul also released a version of the track on Bandcamp in 2013.

, a special edition vinyl release of "Jasmine" was expected. Jai Paul announced that the record—which was to be scented with jasmine—would contain a remix of the single. A website launched with Jai Paul's 2019 single "He"/"Do You Love Her Now" also allowed users to stream a version of "Jasmine".

Reception 
Fitzmaurice, naming "Jasmine" a best new track in a review for Pitchfork, described it as "echo-pop" and compared it to Daft Punk's 2003 single "Something About Us". Cragg noted similarities with the work of D'Angelo and Prince. Caramanica, who also compared "Jasmine" to Prince's work, described the song as a "whispery caress". Morpurgo, observing that the single's synthesizer loop resembles the work of Chromatics, classified "Jasmine" as R&B, as did Singh; while Rindner compares it to Off the Wall–era Michael Jackson. Bassil describes the song's "obscured" mixing as a hallmark of Jai Paul's style.

Ed Sheeran and Octavian have released cover versions of "Jasmine".

References

External links 
 

2012 singles
Jai Paul songs
2012 songs
British contemporary R&B songs